Iroijlaplap Jurelang Zedkaia (13 July 1950 – 7 October 2015) was a Marshallese politician and Iroijlaplap. He served as the  President of the Marshall Islands from 2009 to 2012. He was elected as the country's 5th head of state on October 26, 2009, following the ouster of his predecessor, Litokwa Tomeing, in the country's first successful vote of no confidence.

Biography

Zedkaia was the Iroijlaplap, or traditional paramount chief, of Majuro Atoll, which is the location of the country's capital, Arno and Mili atolls. Before becoming president in 2009, Zedkaia was a five-term elected Senator in the Nitijela, or legislature. He became vice speaker of the Nitijela, before becoming the Speaker of the legislature in January 2008. Zedkaia worked in pharmacy for 15 years and 6 years in the Majuro Atoll Local Government. Zedikaia entered the Nitijela in 1981 as representative and senator of Majuro Atoll, a post he served in the duration of his time in the Nitijela.

President of the Marshall Islands

Zedkaia's predecessor, Litokwa Tomeing, was defeated in a vote of no confidence on October 21, 2009, in a motion led by former president Kessai Note. The ouster of President Tomeing marked the first successful vote of no confidence in Marshallese history.

A presidential election, the outcome of which was determined by the 33-member Nitijela, took place on October 26, 2009.  Speaker Zedkaia and former President Kessai Note were the only candidates for the presidency. Zedkaia was elected as President on October 26, 2009, defeating Note by 17-15, giving Zedkaia the one-vote minimum majority needed to win.  He was sworn into office on November 2, 2009.

Zedkaia nominated Alvin Jacklick as the new Speaker, who was confirmed without opposition.

Zedkaia's mother, Leroij Atama Zedkaia, the paramount chief of Majuro Atoll, died on November 19, 2010, at the age of 79. Zedkaia had previously carried out chiefly duties on behalf of his mother during her lifetime. President Zedkaia assumed the chiefly titles for all of the lands on Majuro that had been previously governed by Leroij Atama following her death. He then assumed all chiefly duties in his own name. The state funeral for his mother was the largest to take place in the Marshall Islands since the death of President Amata Kabua in 1996. Zedkaia died in Majuro on 7 October 2015, aged 65.

References

External links
Islands Business: Jurelang Zedkaia becomes new Marshall Islands President
U.S. Office of Insular Affairs: The Marshall Islands Inaugurates a New President

1950 births
2015 deaths
Marshallese chiefs
Members of the Legislature of the Marshall Islands
Speakers of the Legislature of the Marshall Islands
Presidents of the Marshall Islands
People from Majuro
United Democratic Party (Marshall Islands) politicians
21st-century Marshallese politicians